The Boot Heel volcanic field is located in the Bootheel region of southwest New Mexico, adjacent areas of southeastern Arizona, and northwest Mexico. The field covers an area of more than 24,000 km2. The field includes nine volcanic calderas ranging in age from 26.9 to 35.3 Ma. Extrusive products include rhyolitic ignimbrites along with basalt, andesite, and rhyolite lava flows. The major ash flow tuff sheets produced, range in volume from 35 to 650 km3.

Activity throughout most of the Boot Heel volcanic field paused between 33 and 28 million years ago. The earlier pulse of activity involved less evolved magmas, while the later pulse was relatively depleted in volatiles. The pause in activity has been interpreted as a period of tectonic reorganization along the west coast of North America, including the birth of the San Andreas fault, that temporarily shifted volcanism to the east.

The field includes the Geronimo-Animas volcanic field and the Palomas volcanic field.

Geronimo volcanic field 
The Geronimo volcanic field (also known as the San Bernardino volcanic field) is a monogenetic volcanic field and a sub-section of the Boot Heel volcanic field in southeastern Arizona, US.

Calderas
The calderas of the Boot Heel field and their associated ignimbrites include:
 Pyramid Mountains
 Muir caldera 35.3 Ma (tuff of Woodhall Canyon)
 Peloncillo Mountains
 Steins caldera 34.4 Ma (tuff of Steins)
 Animas Mountains
 Juniper caldera 33.5 Ma (Oak Creek Tuff)
 Animas Peak caldera 33.5 Ma (tuff of Black Bill Canyon)
 Tullous caldera 35.1 Ma (Bluff Creek Tuff)
 Chiricahua Mountains
 Geronimo Trail caldera 32.7 Ma (Gillespie Tuff)
 Clanton Draw caldera 27.4 Ma (Park Tuff)
 Portal caldera 27.6 Ma (tuff of Horseshoe Canyon)
 Turkey Creek caldera 26.9 Ma (Rhyolite Canyon Tuff)

See also
 List of volcanoes in the United States
 Chiricahua National Monument
 Peloncillo Mountains (Hidalgo County)
 Peloncillo Mountains (Cochise County)

References

Volcanic fields of Arizona
New Mexico Bootheel
Volcanic fields of New Mexico
Landforms of Hidalgo County, New Mexico
Monogenetic volcanic fields
Landforms of Cochise County, Arizona
Calderas of Arizona
Calderas of New Mexico
Eocene calderas
Oligocene calderas